Mycoplana ramosa is a gram-negative bacteria from the genus of Mycoplana.

References

External links
Type strain of Mycoplana ramosa at BacDive -  the Bacterial Diversity Metadatabase

 

Rhizobiaceae
Bacteria described in 1990